= Elkpen =

Street artist based in Los Angeles, California, US

Elkpen (a.k.a. Christian Kasperkovitz) is a street artist based in Los Angeles, California whose work contemplates the effect of urban life on familiar, threatened or extinct flora and fauna. Elkpen can do her work in any size, place or thing that offers itself, sometimes it's a retail or corporate setting. Sometimes even a park bench, matchbook or post card her work may appear on. Her work has reached numerous cities and counties such as Los Angeles, San Francisco, New York, Canada and Mexico. In 2014, she was commissioned to create the design on the exterior of the Los Angeles River Rover, a mobile classroom which is used to teach students about the significance of the Los Angeles River to wildlife in the city. Elkpen also takes the time to do work shops with youth, presentations for communities and non profit organizations. She also associates with corporate clients to create authentic and socially progressive images and content.

Elkpen's work has been seen on buildings, busses, beaches, fences, light poles and bus benches in the US and Canada. She has been working as a freelance artist for over 20 years with the slogan in the back of her mind "no job is too large or too small".

Elkpen's work uses both images and words to convey biological, historical, and environmental information to draw the viewer's attention to the wildlife or lack of wildlife in a particular location. The key that distinguishes her projects from other people is her ability to hand draw images with great quality. Hand drawn images are more natural plus can give off a more lively feel for the viewers.

Elkpen's subjects have included cottonwood trees, alder trees, coastal prairies, Grizzlies, Giant Swallowtail and Anise Swallowtail butterflies, Fairy Shrimp, Western Kingbirds, Goldfinches, Northern Mockingbirds, Yellow Chevroned Parakeets, Black Phoebes, Woodpeckers, Crows, Bushtits and many other birds found in Southern California. She also works with clients to create authentic and socially progressive images and content that weave together a connection to place and the community around it as well as the clients overall mission.
